Abraham Lincoln is a 2022 American television miniseries directed by Malcolm Venville. The three-part miniseries chronicles the life of Abraham Lincoln, the sixteenth President of the United States and premiered on February 20, 2022, on History.

Main cast
Graham Sibley as Abraham Lincoln
Justin Salinger as Ulysses S. Grant
Colin Moss as William H. Seward
Jenny Stead as Mary Todd Lincoln
Wayne Harrison as Edwin Stanton
Stefan Adegbola as Frederick Douglass

Episodes

See also
 Washington (2020 History Channel miniseries)
 Grant (2020 History Channel miniseries)
 Theodore Roosevelt (2022 History Channel miniseries)

References

External links

2020s American television miniseries
American films based on actual events
Cultural depictions of Abraham Lincoln
Cultural depictions of Ulysses S. Grant
Historical television series
Television series about the American Civil War
Television series based on actual events
Television series set in the 19th century
Films directed by Malcolm Venville